Bharat FC (also known as Kalyani Bharat FC) was an Indian professional football team based in Pune, Maharashtra that competed in the I-League, then top tier of Indian football league system. The team was founded on 26 August 2014 by Kalyani Group as a direct-entry team into the I-League, making them the second direct-entry side in league history after Bengaluru FC.

The name of the team, as well as their home stadium, the Balewadi Sports Complex, were officially announced on 23 November 2014. But after a disappointing season in I-League the club withdrew and was eventually dissolved.

History
In 2013, in a bid to increase the popularity of the I-League – India's top football league – the All India Football Federation approved the addition of teams into the league via bidding for a direct-entry slot. The first two teams to be allowed into the I-League via direct-entry were Bengaluru FC and Mumbai Tigers but only Bengaluru FC played in the 2013–14 season. Despite the failure of Mumbai Tigers, Bengaluru FC proved to be an amazing success for the I-League as the Bangalore club managed to bring in full-houses to all their matches as well as even win the league in their very first season. This thus made the AIFF announce that they would be accepting bids for new direct-entry teams for the 2014–15 season. On 26 August 2014, after the AIFF reviewed the bidders, they announced that Kalyani Group had won the right to start a direct-entry club for the 2014–15 season.

After winning the bid for the team, in November 2014, Kalyani Group signed their first ever head coach for the football team in former Wolverhampton Wanderers player Stuart Watkiss. They also appointed Stanley Rozario as assistant coach. Kalyani Group then signed their first ever player on 10 November 2014 when New Zealand international Kris Bright signed for the club, who also represented New Zealand at the 2010 FIFA World Cup. After making their first signings, the Kalyani Group officially announced the name of the club on 23 November 2014 as Bharat FC.

The club started the season with two friendlies against Bombay Engineer Group, which they won 3–0, and the second one 5–0, courtesy two goals from Steven Dias and a goal each from Subhash Singh, Surojit Bose and Jayashelan Prasad. In the last friendly before the season, Bharat FC played against Air India and managed a 2–2 draw with a goal each from Kris Bright and Gunashekar Vignesh.

2014–15 I-League
The 2014–15 I-League was their first and only top flight season, they ever competed. For their maiden season, The Lions signed experienced foreigners like Englishman Bobby Hassell, New Zealander Kris Bright. They rope in Beninese Romuald Boco as Marquee player, who earned 50 caps for his country. Palestinian Omar Jarun was also signed in March 2015 for an 18-month deal completing the club's Asian player quota.

In their first ever league match, the debutants held Dempo SC to a goalless draw. Later they defeated giants Mohun Bagan AC by 1–0. On 27 January 2015, Bright scored the first goal for his club, netting a 14th-minute goal against Royal Wahingdoh but they lost the game by 1–2. Kris Bright emerged as the top goalscorer for Bharat with 6 goals in the league.

Bharat FC has competed in 20 matches in the league season and managed to win only 3 matches alongside 10 draws and 7 defeats. Thus the club finished at the bottom of the league table with 18 points, behind Dempo SC.<ref>2014-15 I-League fixtures and points table indiafooty.com. Retrieved 26 March 2021</ref> But they were not relegated as they had relegation immunity for two years.

Colours and kits
During the club's first ever kit launch event on 2 January 2015, it was announced that the club's colours would be based on the team's motto, "Together, Forever and Triumphant", which are blue, red, and white. The home kit was coloured in dark blue which stands for the "Peoples Football" while the away kit is predominantly red. The club's third kit was coloured completely white with the colours blue and red running horizontally across the shirt. The red denotes "passion and vitality" while blue stands for "truth and loyalty".

Ownership
Bharat FC was formed through an initiative by Kalyani Group, a privately held industrial group, headquartered in Pune, Maharashtra, India, that is focused in four primary sectors, viz. Engineering Steel, Automotive & Non-Automotive Components, Renewable Energy & Infrastructure and Specialty Chemicals. Amit Kalyani was the club's first and only managing director.

Kit manufacturers and shirt sponsors

Stadium

When Bharat FC's name was announced, the Balewadi Sports Complex was also announced as the first ever stadium to be used by the club. The stadium has a capacity of 12,000. The team has stated their intention to eventually construct their own football stadium with Manjri being the initial looked at location for the stadium.

During the 2015 season, the team had their training group located in Manjri.

 Disfunction 
The team was officially launched in November 2014, but despite investing heavily, Bharat FC just managed to gain only 18 points from 20 games in the 2014–15 I-League season, finishing at the bottom. The return on investment being abysmal, the club didn’t see I-League as an economically viable investment anymore. With minimal activity ahead of their second season and several staff, including CEO Suvrat Thatte, resigning, the Pune-based club only played one season in the I-League.

Team records

Overall records

Head Coach's Record

Technical staffs

Notable former playersFor all former notable Bharat FC players with a Wikipedia article, see: Bharat FC players''.

See also
 List of football clubs in Maharashtra
 Defunct football clubs in India
 Sports in Maharashtra

References

External links

Bharat FC at Soccerway

Bharat FC at BeSoccer
Bharat FC at Fotmob (archived)
Bharat FC at WorldFootball.net
 Official club website (archived)
Bharat FC at Global Sports Archive

 
Association football clubs established in 2014
Football clubs in Pune
I-League clubs
2014 establishments in Maharashtra
Defunct football clubs in India
Association football clubs disestablished in 2015
2015 disestablishments in India